AfroBasket Women 2019 Qualification occurred on various dates on 2019. It was determined which African national basketball teams would qualify for the 2019 Women's Afrobasket. Teams will competed other teams in their respective "zones" for a spot in the Championship tournament.

Qualified Teams
Five teams qualified for the tournament before the qualification round took place. Seven more teams claimed spots in the tournament through Zonal Qualifying.

Zones

Zone 1

Zone 2
A regional tournament was held from 17 to 19 May 2019 in Praia, Cape Verde. Despite losing the first game, Cape Verde qualified on aggregate 108-98.

Zone 3

Zone 4
A regional tournament was be held from 4 to 5 May 2019 in Yaoundé, Cameroon. After winning the two games against DR Congo, Cameroon earned its qualification for the 2019 Women's Afrobasket.

Zone 5
A regional tournament will be held from 26 June to 1 July 2019 in Kampala, Uganda. Uganda, Egypt, Kenya and Rwanda will participate in this tournament. Egypt earned its qualification for the 2019 Women's Afrobasket.

Group phase

Knockout phase

Semi-finals

Third-place game

Final

Zone 6
A regional tournament will be held on 8 June 2019 in Harare, Zimbabwe. After winning the two games against Zimbabwe, Angola earned its qualification for the 2019 Women's Afrobasket.

Wildcard
 DR Congo and  Kenya earned a spot for the Women's AfroBasket with a wildcard.

References

External links 
 2019 FIBA Women's Afrobasket Qualifiers

qualification
2019 in African basketball